Niqiu is a town of Taihe County in northwestern Anhui province, China, located  north of the county seat along China National Highway 105. , it has three residential communities and 10 villages under its administration.

See also
List of township-level divisions of Anhui

References

Towns in Anhui